President Obiang Nguema International Airport , is an airport located  southwest of the town of Mengomeyén, (also spelled Mongomeyen) in the mainland province of Wele-Nzas, Equatorial Guinea. The airport is named after Teodoro Obiang Nguema Mbasogo, who has been president of Equatorial Guinea since 1979.

The airport is the latest airport to be built in Equatorial Guinea and is the fifth international airport serving Equatorial Guinea, and is designed to connect the nation's geographically isolated areas such as Annobón and Corisco to the main population centers.

Construction
The new airport took 72 months to complete and was fully funded by the Government of Equatorial Guinea, costing over 190 billion CFA francs. It is one of many recent government initiatives intended to promote economic and infrastructure development throughout the region.

Inauguration
The airport was inaugurated on Equatorial Guinea's Independence Day, 12 October 2012. The inauguration was presided over by President Obiang Nguema Mbasogo and his wife Constancia Mangue, with the attendance of the President of the Republic of São Tomé and Príncipe, Manuel Pinto da Costa, guest of honour of the celebrations of independence. During the inauguration the Minister of Civil Aviation Fausto Abeso Fuma claimed the new airport is the best equipped, not only of Equatorial Guinea, but of Central Africa.

Facilities
The runway can handle aircraft in the Boeing 747-400 class.

The Mongomeyen VOR-DME (Ident: MGY) is located just north of the field.

See also

 Transport in Equatorial Guinea
 List of airports in Equatorial Guinea

References

External links
OpenStreetMap - Mengomeyen
FallingRain - President Obiang Nguema International Airport

Airports in Equatorial Guinea
Wele-Nzas